

Werner Friebe (12 July 1897 – 8 March 1962) was a German general (Generalmajor) in the Wehrmacht during World War II who commanded the 8th Panzer Division. He was a recipient of the Knight's Cross of the Iron Cross. Friebe surrendered to the British forces in May 1945 and was released in 1948. He was the younger brother of General Helmut Friebe, who was also a Knight's Cross recipient.

Awards and decorations

 Knight's Cross of the Iron Cross on 21 April 1944 as Oberst and commander of 8. Panzer-Division

References

 

1897 births
1962 deaths
Major generals of the German Army (Wehrmacht)
German Army personnel of World War I
Recipients of the clasp to the Iron Cross, 1st class
Recipients of the Gold German Cross
Recipients of the Knight's Cross of the Iron Cross
German prisoners of war in World War II held by the United Kingdom
People from Namysłów
People from the Province of Silesia
Prussian Army personnel
Reichswehr personnel
German Army generals of World War II